Helix godetiana is a species of large, air-breathing land snail, a terrestrial pulmonate gastropod mollusk in the family Helicidae, the typical snails. This species is endemic to Greece.

References

External links 

Helix (gastropod)
Molluscs of Europe
Endemic fauna of Greece
Gastropods described in 1878
Taxonomy articles created by Polbot